This article lists the endorsements made by members of the 110th United States Congress for candidates for their party's nominations in the 2008 United States presidential election. All of the Democratic members of Congress are also superdelegates to their party's presidential nominating convention, except for those from Florida and Michigan. For further details of superdelegates and their voting intentions see List of superdelegates at the 2008 Democratic National Convention. This page lists congressional endorsements, which are distinct from superdelegates' intentions to vote.

Candidates for the US 2008 presidential election who have congressional endorsements

List of senators

List of representatives

Past candidates

Democratic
Joe Biden
Sen. Thomas Carper (DE)

Chris Dodd
Rep. Xavier Becerra (CA) (Obama)
Rep. Rosa DeLauro (CT) (Obama)
Rep. Chris Murphy (CT) (Obama)
Rep. Tim Ryan (OH) (Clinton)

John Edwards
Rep. Bruce Braley (IA) (Obama)
Rep. G.K. Butterfield (NC) (Obama)
Rep. Bob Etheridge (NC)
Rep. Stephanie Herseth-Sandlin (SD) (Obama)
Rep. Charlie Gonzalez (TX) (Obama)
Rep. Eddie Bernice Johnson (TX) (Obama)
Rep. Mike McIntyre (NC)
Rep. Mike Michaud (ME)
Rep. Brad Miller (NC) (Obama)
Rep. Jim Oberstar (MN) (Obama)
Rep. Dave Obey (WI) (Obama)
Rep. David Price (NC) (Obama)
Rep. Heath Shuler (NC) (Clinton)
Rep. Bart Stupak (MI)
Rep. Mel Watt (NC) (Obama)

Bill Richardson
Sen. Jeff Bingaman (NM) (Obama)
Rep. Mike Doyle (PA)
Rep. Gene Green (TX) (Clinton)
Rep. Solomon Ortiz (TX) (Clinton)
Rep. Ed Pastor (AZ) (Clinton)
Rep. Silvestre Reyes (TX) (Clinton)
Rep. Tom Udall (NM)

Republican
Rudy Giuliani
Sen. David Vitter (LA)
Sen. Norm Coleman (MN) (McCain)
Sen. Kit Bond (MO)
Rep. Judy Biggert (IL)
Rep. Mary Bono (CA)
Rep. Charles Boustany (LA)
Rep. Charlie Dent (PA)
Rep. David Dreier (CA)
Rep. Jo Ann Emerson (MO)
Rep. Phil English (PA)
Rep. Vito Fossella (NY)
Rep. Jim Gerlach (PA)
Rep. Peter T. King (NY)
Rep. Jerry Lewis (IL)
Rep. Frank LoBiondo (NJ)
Rep. Candice S. Miller (MI)
Rep. Devin Nunes (CA)
Rep. Jon Porter (NV)
Rep. George Radanovich (CA)
Rep. Dave Reichert (WA)
Rep. Edward R. Royce (CA)
Rep. Pete Sessions (TX)
Rep. James T. Walsh (NY)
Rep. Jerry Weller (IL)
Del. Luis Fortuño (PR)

Mike Huckabee
Rep. John Boozman (AR)
Rep. Duncan Hunter (CA)
Rep. Bob Inglis (SC)
Rep. John Linder (GA)
Rep. Don Young (AK)

Mitt Romney
Sen. Wayne Allard (CO)
Sen. Bob Bennett (UT)
Sen. Thad Cochran (MS)
Sen. Jim DeMint (SC)
Sen. Judd Gregg (NH)
Sen. Orrin Hatch (UT)
Sen. Lisa Murkowski (AK)
Rep. Robert Aderholt (AL)
Rep. Rodney Alexander (LA)
Rep. Brian Bilbray (CA)
Rep. Marsha Blackburn (TN)
Rep. Ginny Brown-Waite (FL)
Rep. Dave Camp (MI)
Rep. John Campbell (CA)
Rep. Chriss Cannon (UT)
Rep. John Carter (TX)
Rep. Howard Coble (NC)
Rep. Mike Conaway (TX)
Rep. Ander Crenshaw (FL)
Rep. Vernon Ehlers (MI)
Rep. Tom Feeney (FL)
Rep. Mike Ferguson (NJ)
Rep. Virginia Foxx (NC)
Rep. Phil Gingrey (GA)
Rep. Kay Granger (TX)
Rep. Wally Herger (CA)
Rep. Peter Hoekstra (MI)
Rep. Jack Kingston (GA)
Rep. Joe Knollenberg (MI)
Rep. Ron Lewis (KY)
Rep. Connie Mack (FL)
Rep. Jim McCrery (LA)
Rep. Buck McKeon (CA)
Rep. Thomas Petri (WI)
Rep. Tom Price (GA)
Rep. Ralph Regula (OH)
Rep. Hal Rogers (KY)
Rep. Mike Rogers (AL)
Rep. Dana Rohrabacher (CA)
Rep. Bill Shuster (PA)
Rep. Mike Simpson (ID)
Rep. Lamar Smith (TX)
Rep. Tom Tancredo (CO)
Rep. Lynn Westmoreland (GA)
Rep. Ed Whitfield (KY)

Fred Thompson
Sen. Lamar Alexander (TN)
Sen. Bob Corker (TN)
Sen. Jim Inhofe (OK)
Sen. Roger Wicker (MS)
Rep. J. Gresham Barrett (SC)
Rep. Dan Burton (IN)
Rep. Steve Buyer (IN)
Rep. David Davis (TN)
Rep. Jimmy Duncan (TN)
Rep. Louie Gohmert (TX)
Rep. Steve King (IA)
Rep. Donald Manzullo (IL)
Rep. Thad McCotter (MI)
Rep. Susan Myrick (NC)
Rep. Jeff Miller (FL)
Rep. Adam Putnam (FL)
Rep. John Sullivan (OK)
Rep. Lee Terry (NE)
Rep. Zach Wamp (TN)
Rep. Lynn Westmoreland (GA)

References

External links
Endorsements '08 from The Hill, complete list of publicly committed backers

2008-related lists
2008 United States presidential election endorsements
2000s politics-related lists